Tania Weekes is a British karateka. She is the winner of multiple European Karate Championships and World Karate Championships Karate medals.

Achievements
 1998  World Karate Championships  Kumite Bronze Medal
 2001  European Karate Championships  Kumite  Bronze Medal
 2001  World Games Bronze Medal
 2002  European Karate Championships Kumite Silver Medal
 2005  World Games Bronze Medal
 2005  European Karate Championships Kumite Bronze Medal

References

Year of birth missing (living people)
Living people
English female karateka
Black British sportswomen
World Games bronze medalists
Competitors at the 2001 World Games
Competitors at the 2005 World Games
World Games medalists in karate